Prince Aleksander Ludwik Radziwiłł (4 August 1594 – 30 March 1654) was a Polish–Lithuanian nobleman.

He was the Ordynat of Nieśwież, Stolnik of Lithuania since 1626, Krajczy of Lithuania since 1630, governor of Brześć Litewski Voivodeship since 1631 to 1635, Court Marshal of Lithuania since 1635, Grand Marshal of Lithuania in 1637-1654 and voivode of Połock Voivodship since 1654. He also held the title Starost słonimski, upicki, brasławski, szadowski, nowowołyński, jurborski, olicki.

He married Tekla Anna Wołłowicz in 1626, Katarzyna Eugenia Tyszkiewicz in 1639 and Lucricia Marie Strozzi in October, 1642 in Warsaw. His marriage to Katarzyna Eugenia Tyszkiewicz, widow of Konstanty Wiśniowiecki's son, led to the conflict between Aleksander Ludwik Radziwłł and Jeremi Wiśniowiecki over the inheritance of Konstanty. Eventually, Katarzyna defected to Jeremi's side and divorced Aleksander, who was forced to give up his claims.

He kept away from politics during the reign of Sigismund III Vasa, but supported Władysław IV Vasa, in his election in 1632. However towards the end of his life he distanced himself from Władysław, by opposing his plans of war with Ottomans.

References

Secular senators of the Polish–Lithuanian Commonwealth
1594 births
1654 deaths
Aleksander Ludwik
Grand Marshals of the Grand Duchy of Lithuania
Court Marshals of the Grand Duchy of Lithuania